Caminando (Walking) It is the name of the 10° studio album by Rubén Blades with Son Del Solar, his first album after moving from Elektra to Sony International published on May 28, 1991. The album was a critical and commercial success with Latin and salsa audiences, marking a temporary return to Blades earlier coro-heavy style which marked the collaborations with Willie Colón of a decade earlier on Fania. The album also reinstated the political content of his music, though some listeners still found the social criticism lacking. Blades new band for Sony, Son del Solar, includes four of the Seis del Solar members from his Elektra albums: percussionists Ralph Irizarry, Eddie Montalvo and Robby Ameen with pianist Oscar Hernández. The album reached number three on the Billboard Tropical Albums chart and received a Grammy nomination for Best Tropical Latin Album in 1992.

Track listing
The title track "Caminando", "Camaleón", and the trombone heavy "Prohibido olvidar," were released as singles. All songs are written by Blades. The song "Cipriano Armenteros" was also popular and became known as one of the first successful examples of "narrative-salsa" genre.

Certification

References

1991 albums
Rubén Blades albums
Spanish-language albums